Dhodia are an Adivasi people who have been placed in the Indian communities recognition, under Schedule Tribes. The majority of the Dhodia tribes are located in the southern part of Gujarat (Navsari, Surat and Valsad districts), Dadra and Nagar Haveli and Daman and Diu, Madhya Pradesh, Maharashtra, Karnataka and Rajasthan. In Maharashtra, they are found mainly in the district of Thane. They speak Dhodia language, which has some unique words, as well as some words influenced by Gujarati and Marathi.

Religion and customs
Most of the dhodia believe in traditional religious practices . 
majority of Dhodia follows Hinduism. Some however adapted Christianity. Some are following their AdiVasi traditions, worshiping nature. Dhodia also has many subcaste/Kul within them.

Dhodia Females traditionally wear 'Kachhedo' or it called 'Dhadku' type of saree which mostly gives resembles of Marathi saree. 

]

Festivals
They celebrate festivals that other Hindus do. Diwali, Holi are some examples. The majority of Dhodia believe in and are devoted to "Kanasari" or "Kanseri" (Goddess of food). They celebrate the "Kanseri" festival annually at harvest. The "Kanseri" Goddess is otherwise known as Goddess "Annapurna" by many Hindus.

The Dhodia also celebrate "Divaso".

Vagh baras is also celebrated in a unique fashion in some Dhodia villages where men colour themselves in stripes representing the Vagh( tiger) and others as plain white or other colours denoting cattle. The tiger chases the cattle. Finally at the end of the sport the village inhabitants eat together and celebrate. During five days of Diwali they celebrate their folk dance called Gheria.
Also they make Bhakhras for pooja rituals to their Kuldev on this day.

See also

 Naikda

References 

https://pin.it/2k1Vztp

External links

Dhodia Website 
Dhodia FaceBook Page
Dhodia FaceBook Group
Dhodia Community
RDG
Dhodia Matrimony
Dhodia History
Dhodia Language
Dhodia Kul(કુળ)
Dhodia Videos
Dhodia Blog
Dhodia Book 1:અહા આમું ઢોડિયા - શ્રી.કુલીન પટેલ
Dhodia Book 2:ઢોડિયા જાતી: બોલી,સાહિત્ય અને સંસકૃતિ - સ્વ.શ્રી મંછારામભાઈ નારણદાસ પટેલ
Dhodia Book 3:વડલો

Social groups of Gujarat
Social groups of Maharashtra
Scheduled Tribes of Dadra and Nagar Haveli
Tribal communities of Gujarat
Tribal communities of Maharashtra
Scheduled Tribes of Gujarat
Scheduled Tribes of Daman and Diu
Scheduled Tribes of Goa